Trevor William Ross (born 16 January 1957) is a former professional footballer who played as a midfielder. Ross played for English clubs Arsenal, Everton, Portsmouth, Sheffield United and Bury. He also featured for AEK Athens of the Greek First Division. Born in England, Ross represented Scotland at under-21 level.

Career

Ross started his career at Arsenal, joining the club's academy at 12 years old. In 1972 he became an apprentice at the club, signing professionally just two years later. He then made his first-team debut as a substitute against Liverpool on 1 February 1975. Ross was a regular in the latter half of the 1975–76 and throughout the 1976–77 seasons. He was ousted from the side by David Price at the start of the 1977–78 season, and in November 1977 moved to Everton for £170,000. He played 67 games in all for Arsenal, scoring 9 goals.

Ross made his Everton debut on 5 November 1977 in a 1–0 defeat of Derby County. He then linked up on loan with sides Portsmouth and Sheffield United in the 1982–83 season. He went on to play 120 matches scoring 16 goals for the Toffees. In the summer of 1983, Ross moved on to Sheffield. After a spell in the Greek First Division with AEK Athens, he returned for a brief stint with Sheffield United. Ross went on to see out his playing days in the Football League with three seasons at Bury.

He then moved into non-league football, first a short spell with Hyde United before Tommy Docherty signed him up at Altrincham. He managed club Ashton United for the 1989–90 season until he was dismissed only three months into the next season.

Personal life

After leaving football, Ross worked as an HGV driver. In 2007, he worked as a transport supervisor, and in his spare time coached youngsters at Oldham Sports Centre.

Ross's father, Willie, was also a footballer who played for Arbroath and Bradford City in the 1940s and 1950s. Ross could claim Scottish ancestry through his father, and was capped once by Scotland at under-21 level, despite having played for his native England at youth level.

References

External links
 

1957 births
Living people
English people of Scottish descent
Scottish footballers
English footballers
Footballers from Ashton-under-Lyne
Association football midfielders
Scotland under-21 international footballers
Arsenal F.C. players
Everton F.C. players
Portsmouth F.C. players
Sheffield United F.C. players
AEK Athens F.C. players
Bury F.C. players
Hyde United F.C. players
Altrincham F.C. players
English Football League players
Super League Greece players
National League (English football) players
Scottish expatriate footballers
English expatriate footballers
Scottish expatriate sportspeople in Greece
English expatriate sportspeople in Greece
Expatriate footballers in Greece